Sibley East High School is a four-year public high school and is a combination of children from three towns, Gaylord, Green Isle, and Arlington. It is located between the Twin Cities and Mankato, Minnesota in the United States about 10 miles off of State Highway 169. It is associated with the Minnesota State High School League.  The total of K-12 students in Sibley East numbers 1213 students.

History 
Sibley East has been through multiple consolidations and cooperative programs before its current form.
Sibley East first arose, in 1986, as a cooperative program between the Arlington-Green Isle and Henderson school districts in eastern Sibley County. This program would consolidate the Henderson Tigers and Arlington-Green Isle Indians into the joint Sibley East Bengals varsity team. Though this program ended in 1989, shortly before Henderson consolidated with Le Sueur as the Le Sueur-Henderson school district, the title, Sibley East, again appeared in 1991, as the name of the current high school and school district, with the consolidation of Arlington-Green Isle school district with Gaylord school district. With the full consolidation of Gaylord, the varsity team was changed for the last time to the Sibley East Wolverines.

Football 
Sibley East has a history for football dating back to its first State Championship in 1972. The school won State Championships in 1974, 1976, and 1980. The team played in the 2012 state playoffs for the first time since the 1980s.

References

External links 
Sibley East High School
Max Preps Football Website: Sibley East Wolverines

Schools in Sibley County, Minnesota
Education in Sibley County, Minnesota
Public high schools in Minnesota